José de Lima (born 9 July 1907, date of death unknown) was a Portuguese sprinter. He competed in the men's 100 metres at the 1928 Summer Olympics.

References

1907 births
Year of death missing
Athletes (track and field) at the 1928 Summer Olympics
Portuguese male sprinters
Olympic athletes of Portugal
Place of birth missing